James Memorial may refer to the following:

Awards
Eddie James Memorial Trophy
James Gatschene Memorial Trophy
James Norris Memorial Trophy
James Norris Memorial Trophy (IHL)
James Tait Black Memorial Prize

Buildings and structures
Captain James Cook Memorial in Canberra, ACT, Australia
James Blackstone Memorial Library in Branford, Connecticut
James Buchanan Memorial in Washington, D.C.
James Cardinal Gibbons Memorial Statue in Washington, D.C.
James A. Garfield Memorial in Cleveland, Ohio
James A. Garfield Monument in Washington, D.C.
James Garfield Memorial, Philadelphia
James J. and Helen Storrow Memorial in Boston, Massachusetts
James Madison Memorial Building in Washington, D.C.
James Madison Memorial High School in Madison, Wisconsin
James Memorial Library in Williston, North Dakota
James M. Hill Memorial High School in Miramichi, New Brunswick, Canada
James Sangster Memorial in Ipswich, Queensland, Australia
James Scott Memorial Fountain in Detroit, Michigan
St. James Memorial Chapel (Howe, Indiana)

Events
Dr. James Penny Memorial Stakes
Rowe Memorial Handicap, originally called the James Rowe Memorial

Organizations
James Madison Memorial Fellowship Foundation

See also
List of memorials to James A. Garfield
List of memorials to James Madison
List of memorials to James Monroe
List of memorials to James K. Polk